Shahrak-e Motahhari (also Romanized as Shahrak-e Moţahharī; also known as Shahrak-e Moţahharī-ye Varzard and Var-e Zard) is a village in Tashan-e Gharbi Rural District, Tashan District, Behbahan County, Khuzestan Province, Iran. At the 2006 census, its population was 577, in 107 families.

References 

Populated places in Behbahan County